National Highway 53, combination of old (NH6 Surat-Kolkata), (NH200 Bilaspur-Chandikhole) & (NH5A Chandikhole-Paradeep) is a national highway in India. It connects Hajira in Gujarat and Paradeep port in Odisha. NH-53 traverses the states of Gujarat, Maharashtra, Chhattisgarh and Odisha in India. The road is the part of AH46 network in India and it is officially listed as running over 1949 km (1211 mi) from Kolkata to Surat. it is also known as Surat - Kolkata Highway. It passes through Maharashtra, Chhattisgarh and Odisha states.

The National Highway Authority of India (NHAI) has created a Guinness World Record of constructing the longest highway stretch of 75 kilometres (km) between Amravati and Akola in the least time--105 hours and 33 minutes. The newly constructed road is part of National Highway 53.

Route
Route of primary national highway 53 passes through four states of India.

Gujarat
Hajira, Surat, Vyara, Songadh, Uchchhal - Maharashtra border.

Maharashtra
Gujarat border [Navapur] Dhule, Jalgaon, Khamgaon, Akola, Amravati, Nagpur, Bhandara, Tirora,Gondia

Chhattisgarh
Maharashtra border - Rajnandgaon, Durg, Bhilai, Raipur, Arang, Ghorari Mahasamund Saraipali - Odisha border.

Odisha
Chhattisgarh border - Bargarh, Sambalpur, Deogarh, Kaniah, Talcher, Kamakhyanagar, Sukinda, Dubri, Chandhikhol, Haridaspur, Silipur, Bhutamundai, Paradip Port.

Asian Highways
The stretch of National Highway 53 from Dhule in Maharashtra to Deogarh in Odisha is part of Asian Highway 46.

Junctions list

Gujarat

 Terminal point at Hazira port.
  near surat
  near Palsana
  near Vyara
  near Songadh
Maharashtra

  near Visarwadi
  near Shewali
  near Kusumbe
  near Dhule
  near Dhule
  near Jalgaon
  near Jalgaon
  near Muktainagar
  near Malkapur
  near Nandura
  near Khamgaon
  near Khamgaon
  near Khamgaon
  near Balapur
  near Akola
  near Akola
  near Murtizapur
  near Hiwra Budruk
  near Nandgaon Peth
  near Talegaon
  near Gondkheri
  near Nagpur
  near Nagpur
  near Nagpur
  near Nagpur
  near Gumthala
  near Bhandara
  near Sakoli
  near Kohmara
  near Deori
Chhattisgarh

  near Raipur
  near Ghorai Mahasamund
  near Saraipali
Odisha
  near Sohela
  near Bargarh
  near Sambalpur
  near Pravasuni
  near Sarapal
  near Talcher
  near Duburi
  near Chandikhole
 Terminal point at Paradip Port

Map with spur routes

See also 

 List of National Highways in India
 List of National Highways in India by state

References

External links 

 NH 53 on OpenStreetMap

National highways in India
National Highways in Gujarat
National Highways in Maharashtra
National Highways in Chhattisgarh
National Highways in Odisha
Transport in Surat
Transport in Paradeep